Margarites smithi, common name the Smith margarite, is a species of sea snail, a marine gastropod mollusk in the family Margaritidae.

Description
The height of the shell attains 1.6 mm, its diameter 1.7 mm.

Distribution
The type of this marine species was collected off Monterey, California.

References

 P. Bartsch, New West American Marine Mollusks; Proceedings of the U.S. National Museum vol. 70

External links
 To Biodiversity Heritage Library (1 publication)
 To Encyclopedia of Life
 To USNM Invertebrate Zoology Mollusca Collection
 To ITIS
 To World Register of Marine Species

smithi
Gastropods described in 1927